Kanjoya was an enterprise software-as-a-service (SaaS) company that developed natural language processing (NLP) based artificial intelligence to understand, measure, and improve customer and employee experience. Founded in 2006 by Armen Berjikly, the company was acquired by Ultimate Software in 2016.

History 
Headquartered in San Francisco, Kanjoya's vision was to deliver "empathy through technology." The company's core intellectual property was a significant advance in sentiment analysis enabling real-time recognition of over 100 human emotions in written text, with greater accuracy than could be expected of human analysts.

In its development phase, preliminary applications of Kanjoya's technology included measuring the emotional reaction of audiences during political debates, understanding how advertisements made consumers feel, and analyzing consumer sentiment to successfully predict future actions of the Federal Reserve Board.

Eventually, Kanjoya focused product development on understanding employee sentiment in the workplace, through inputs including open-ended survey questions and performance reviews.

Berjikly noted: "The area that we thought we could make the most impact, where people were the least understood, but yet affected the biggest part of their lives was [the] employee world."

Products 
At the time of its acquisition, Kanjoya marketed three software-as-a-service offerings:

 Perception to conduct employee surveys, analyze the results, and distribute results to managers
 Perception for Performance to evaluate, develop, and motivate employees
 Perception for Diversity and Inclusion to diagnose conscious and unconscious bias in the workplace

All solutions focussed on understanding employee's qualitative feedback in addition to more traditional quantitative insights.

Recognitions 
Kanjoya was awarded Awesome New Startup at the 2015 HR Technology Conference; and named Gartner's “Cool Vendor in Human Capital Management, 2016.” In a research partnership with the Federal Reserve Board, it was shown that Kanjoya's technology "outperforms the University of Michigan index of consumer sentiment for predicting macroeconomic series such as output and unemployment."

References

Software companies based in California
Companies based in San Francisco
Defunct software companies of the United States
2006 establishments in the United States
2006 establishments in California
Software companies established in 2006
Companies established in 2006